KYZK (107.5 FM, "Mountain Country 107.5") is a radio station broadcasting a classic country format. Licensed to Sun Valley, Idaho, United States, the station is currently owned by Richard Mecham, through licensee Magic Valley Media, LLC, and features programming from ABC Radio.

On November 16, 2020, KYZK changed their format from contemporary hit radio to classic country, branded as "Mountain Country 107.5".

References

External links

YZK
Classic country radio stations in the United States
Radio stations established in 2001
2001 establishments in Idaho